Mount Hutton is a rural locality in the Maranoa Region, Queensland, Australia.

History 
Mount Hutton East Provisional School opened on 13 February 1922 and closed on circa 1924.

References 

Maranoa Region
Localities in Queensland